Håvard Endre Holm (15 December 1943 – 28 July 2017) was a Norwegian civil servant.

He is a cand.jur. by education. He was hired in the Ministry of the Environment in 1972, and was promoted to deputy under-secretary of state in 1989. From 1996 to 31 December 2006 he served as director of the Norwegian Pollution Control Authority, the first year as acting director. He thereafter worked as an advisor with the same agency.

References

1943 births
2017 deaths
Norwegian civil servants
Directors of government agencies of Norway